Sousel is a municipality in the District of Portalegre in Portugal. The population in 2011 was 5,074, in an area of 279.32 km2.

The municipality is famous for its olive trees and as a great hunting region.

The Calça e Pina family was the main developer of Sousel in the 18th century. The economy is mainly based on agriculture, but tourism plays a major role in the region's economy as well.

The present Mayor is Manuel Valério, elected by the Socialist Party. The municipal holiday is Easter Monday.

Parishes
Administratively, the municipality is divided into 4 civil parishes (freguesias):
 Cano
 Casa Branca
 Santo Amaro
 Sousel

Notable people 
 Bruno Bolas (born 1996) a Portuguese professional footballer

Gallery

References

External links
Town Hall official website

 
Towns in Portugal
Populated places in Portalegre District
Municipalities of Portalegre District